Company of Saint George may refer to:

Compagnia di San Giorgio, medieval Italian mercenary company during the Hundred Years' War
Bank of Saint George, Genoese banking company that governed Corsica in the early modern era
Company of Saynt George, a modern medieval re-enactment organization